is a former Japanese football player.

Club statistics

References

External links

J. League (#26)

1987 births
Living people
Osaka Kyoiku University alumni
Association football people from Osaka Prefecture
Japanese footballers
J2 League players
Roasso Kumamoto players
Association football midfielders